The Indian state of West Bengal is divided into five administrative Divisions, namely:
 Presidency division
 Medinipur division
 Burdwan division
 Malda division
 Jalpaiguri division

A group of districts forms a division, which is administered by a 'Divisional Commissioner'. West Bengal is now divided in 23 districts, grouped under five divisions:

See also
 List of subdivisions of West Bengal
 List of districts of West Bengal
 Cities and towns in West Bengal

References